The Museum of Samarra is under construction. It consists of three buildings built on a property of 227,700 square meters, costing 17 billion Iraqi dinars.

Construction
The construction of the museum started in 2014. It consists of three buildings: the first building has a basement and two floors. The second building consists of two parts. The first part consists of a basement, a ground floor and an upper floor, while the second has floors with no basement. The third building is an open area that includes architectural works.

References

Archaeological museums
Museums in Iraq
2014 establishments in Iraq
Samarra